The Provisional Senate of East Indonesia was the upper house of the parliament of State of East Indonesia, a component of the United States of Indonesia. The Senate existed from May 1949 to August 1950, when the State of East Indonesia was dissolved to the unitary Republic of Indonesia.

Background
The State of East Indonesia was formed in the Great East, the area of the Dutch East Indies that the Dutch were able to reassert control over following the Japanese surrender and the Indonesian declaration of independence in August 1945. From 18–24 December 1946, a conference in Denpasar was held to work out the specifics of the state, including producing a provisional constitution, which included provision for a senate with unspecified powers. The senate was later formed based on the 1948 Provisional Senate Act.

Powers
This provisional Senate had the duty to approve the draft constitution drawn up by the Provisional Representative Body. After the planned constitution was enacted, the senate would have been dissolved, to make way for a definitive Senate, to be put together in accordance with the rules laid down in the constitution. The definitive senate would then give its opinion on the Constitution in a second reading. The definitive senate would have been given a broader scope compared to the Provisional Senate. As the constitution was never promulgated, the definitive senate was never formed.

Members 

Elections for members of the senate were completed in May 1949. There were 13 seats in the Senate, with one seat for each region of East Indonesia. The body was officially inaugurated by the President of East Indonesia, Tjokorda Gde Raka Soekawati, on 28 May 1949.

Bibliography

References

1949 establishments in Indonesia
Government agencies established in 1949
Government agencies disestablished in 1950
1950 disestablishments in Indonesia
Historical legislatures
Defunct organizations based in Indonesia
Government of Indonesia